Science Fiction magazine (subtitled "A Review of Speculative Literature") is a long running science fiction critical journal published in Australia by SF academic Van Ikin from the University of Sydney and later the University of Western Australia. Contributing editors have included writer Terry Dowling (who also did important reviewing and critical work in early issues) and book collector and reviewer Keith Curtis.

According to John Clute and Peter Nicholls, "Intended to be a reputable academic journal, as the editorial addresses suggest, SF - ARoSL has oscillated a little uneasily between the academic and the fannish, but has nevertheless published good critical features. Until the more regular and perhaps livelier Australian Science Fiction Review: Second Series appeared in 1986, this was the main repository for Australian sf criticism (especially since its main rival, SF Commentary, was notably irregular in the 1980s), publishing interesting material by its editors by Russell Blackford, George Turner and others."

Editions
The first issue appeared in 1977. 30 issues had appeared by 1990.

No 47 (Vol 18, No 1) appeared in 2016. The most recent issues appeared in 2019. Currently the journal appears at long, less-than-annual intervals.

Contributors
Contributors over the years have included the following:
 Bruce Gillespie
 Russell Blackford
 Terry Dowling
 Richard Harland
 Peter McNamara

Cover artists
Cover artwork for Science Fiction has been contributed predominantly by Dane Ikin and Nick Stathopoulos.

References

External links
Science Fiction magazine home page
Details on past editions
Science Fiction (Australia) at Galactic Central

1977 establishments in Australia
Magazines published in Australia
Magazines established in 1977
Science fiction magazines
Irregularly published magazines